Dover Township is a civil township of Lenawee County in the U.S. state of  Michigan. As of the 2000 census, the township population was 1,787.

Communities
 Cadmus was established in 1887.
 Dover was the name of a former post office in the township. The office opened with the name Unionville on January 15, 1836, with James Phillips as the first postmaster. The office was closed April 22, 1842, and reopened with the name Dover on November 22, 1842. The office operated until November 29, 1867.

Geography

Demographics
As of the census of 2000, there were 1,787 people, 650 households, and 501 families residing in the township. The racial makeup of the township was 97.54% White, 0.28% African American, 0.28% Native American, 0.17% Asian, 0.90% from other races, and 0.84% from two or more races. Hispanic or Latino of any race were 3.58% of the population.

There were 650 households, out of which 33.8% had children under the age of 18 living with them, 66.2% were married couples living together, 7.1% had a female householder with no husband present, and 22.8% were non-families. 17.8% of all households were made up of individuals, and 5.7% had someone living alone who was 65 years of age or older. The average household size was 2.74 and the average family size was 3.12.

In the township the population was spread out, with 28.3% under the age of 18, 6.5% from 18 to 24, 29.3% from 25 to 44, 25.7% from 45 to 64, and 10.2% who were 65 years of age or older. The median age was 37 years. For every 100 females, there were 106.1 males. For every 100 females age 18 and over, there were 104.8 males.

The median income for a household in the township was $45,329, and the median income for a family was $51,587. Males had a median income of $37,750 versus $24,148 for females. The per capita income for the township was $18,299. About 8.8% of families and 10.7% of the population were below the poverty line, including 14.1% of those under age 18 and 10.4% of those age 65 or over.

References

Notes

Sources

External links
 Lenawee County government site
 Complete text of History of Lenawee County published in 1909 by the Western Historical Society

Townships in Lenawee County, Michigan
Townships in Michigan